The Strange Case of Dr. Meade is a 1938 American adventure film directed by Lewis D. Collins and starring Jack Holt, Beverly Roberts and Noah Beery Jr.

Cast
 Jack Holt as Dr. Meade 
 Beverly Roberts as Bonnie 
 Noah Beery Jr. as Mart 
 John Qualen as Stoner 
 Paul Everton as Dr. Hazard 
 Charles Middleton as Lacey 
 Helen Jerome Eddy as Mrs. Lacey 
 Arthur Aylesworth as Reuben 
 Barbara Pepper as Mattie 
 Victor Potel as Steve 
 Harry Woods as Harper 
 Claire Du Brey as Mrs. Thurber 
 George Cleveland as Thurber 
 Jay Ward as Rufe 
 Hollis Jewell as Thad

References

Bibliography
 Darby, William. Masters of Lens and Light: A Checklist of Major Cinematographers and Their Feature Films. Scarecrow Press, 1991.

External links
 

1938 films
1938 drama films
1930s English-language films
American drama films
Films directed by Lewis D. Collins
Columbia Pictures films
1930s American films